KXGM (850 AM) was a radio station that served the Waterloo, Iowa, area. The not-for-profit station broadcast a simulcast of KXGM-FM's Christian Contemporary music format during daytime hours only. KXGM was owned by Extreme Grace Media.

The station's antenna system used three towers arranged in a directional array that concentrated the signal toward the northwest. The transmitter site was located in east Waterloo on Osage Road.

History
The station signed on October 31, 1972 as KLEU. On December 31, 1984, the station was assigned the callsign KQQI. Its callsign was changed back to KLEU on April 23, 1985. On July 18, 1985, the station's callsign was changed to KWOF.

In August 1985, the station was transferred from KLEU, Inc., to Michael Facciani Ministries, Inc.

In May 1990, the station was transferred from Melene Facciani to Debra B. Smith.

In April 1995, the station was transferred from Life Unlimited Communications, Inc., to Friendship Communications, Inc.

From 1997 until October 2006, the station aired a Christian Contemporary music format branded as "The Spirit" under the callsign KWOF. On October 20, 2006, the station flipped to a "legendary Christian rock" format featuring artists from the 1970s through the mid-1990s. The format was branded as "The Prodigal." This date also marked the end of simulcasting Christian Contemporary music programming from sister station KWOF-FM.

In March 2008, Extreme Grace Media (Chris Behmlander, president) reached an agreement to purchase KWOF and KWOF-FM from Friendship Communications (Michael Facciani, president) for a reported sale price of $160,000. The transfer was approved by the FCC on April 23, 2008, and the deal was consummated on July 18, 2008.

On August 8, 2008, the station's call letters were changed to KXGM (reflecting its new ownership) and began simulcasting KXGM-FM programming.

KXGM went silent December 19, 2009 following the sale of the station's transmitter site. The station did not return to the air within a year of going silent; its license was cancelled on July 28, 2011.

References

External links

XGM (AM)
Black Hawk County, Iowa
Defunct radio stations in the United States
XGM
Radio stations established in 1972
1972 establishments in Iowa
Radio stations disestablished in 2009
2009 disestablishments in Iowa
Defunct religious radio stations in the United States
Defunct mass media in Iowa